Calvin Mokoto (born 14 October 1988) is a South African sprint canoer who competed in the late 2000s. At the 2008 Summer Olympics in Beijing, he was eliminated in the semifinals of both the C-1 500 m and the C-1 1000 m events.

References
Sports-Reference.com profile

1988 births
Canoeists at the 2008 Summer Olympics
Living people
Olympic canoeists of South Africa
South African male canoeists